The year 2010 is the seventh year in the history of the Konfrontacja Sztuk Walki, a mixed martial arts promotion based in Poland. In 2010 Konfrontacja Sztuk Walki held 4 events beginning with, KSW: KSW Elimination.

List of events

KSW Elimination 3

KSW: KSW Elimination was a mixed martial arts event held on April 1, 2010, at the CWKS Legia Boxing Club in Warsaw, Poland.

Results

KSW 13: Kumite

KSW 13: Kumite was a mixed martial arts event held on May 7, 2010, at Spodek in Katowice, Poland.

Results

KSW 14: Judgment Day

KSW 14: Judgment Day was a mixed martial arts event held on September 18, 2010, at the Atlas Arena in Lódz, Poland .

Results

KSW Fight Club

KSW Fight Club was a mixed martial arts event held on October 9, 2010, at the Ryn Castle in Ryn, Poland.

Results

See also 
 Konfrontacja Sztuk Walki

References

Konfrontacja Sztuk Walki events
2010 in mixed martial arts